The Fantastic Plastic Machine is a 1969 documentary film following a group of California surfers as they journey to an Australian surfing competition.  The film is narrated by Jay North.  It was directed by Eric and Lowell Blum and was filmed in California, Hawaii, Australia, New Zealand, and Fiji. The music soundtrack was composed by Harry Betts, and released as an album on Epic Records.

Cast
(In alphabetical order)

Steve Bigler
Alan Byrne
Midget Farrelly
Ed Farwell
Skip Frye
Margo Godfrey
George Greenough
Joey Hamasaki
Russell Hughes
Peter Johnson
Robert Lindkvist
Bob McTavish
Ken Morrow
Mickey Munoz
Jay North
Mike Purpus
Ted Spencer
John Witzig
Nat Young

See also
 List of American films of 1969
The Fantastic Plastic Machine -  soundtrack to the film, by Harry Betts.

External links

1969 films
Documentary films about surfing
American sports documentary films
1969 documentary films
Crown International Pictures films
American surfing films
1960s English-language films
1960s American films